The Libertarian Party of Texas is the state affiliate of the Libertarian Party in Texas.

History
In 1971, Texas was one of the 13 original founding state parties at the first Libertarian Party (LP) convention in Denver, Colorado. Over the next five years, county affiliate parties were founded in Travis, Harris, Dallas, and Bexar counties. In February 1980, Charles Fuller of Houston became the first Texas libertarian to appear on the ballot as a Libertarian Party candidate. (Previous candidates ran for write-in votes or as independents.) Fuller ran in a Special Election for State Representative District 80. The party first qualified for statewide ballot access in 1980, and then again on September 1, 1982 with 41,000 petition signatures. The party ran 122 candidates that November. Legal issues making signature collection more difficult prevented the party from achieving ballot access in 1984, but it was able to collect the required 32,000 signatures in 1986 to once again make it on the ballot. Three statewide candidates achieved at least 5% of the vote that November, automatically granting the party ballot access for 1988. 

In the 1990 statewide elections, gubernatorial candidate Jeff Daiell (author of the novel, From Roundheel To Revolutionary) achieved 3.3% of the vote (129,128) and Comptroller candidate Gill Grisham received 5.8%, guaranteeing ballot access through 1994. Daiell's showing is currently the LP of Texas record in a gubernatorial race in terms of percentage; in 2018 Mark Tippetts broke the record for most votes. On March 9, 1998, U.S. District Judge James Nowlin stopped the State of Texas from requiring voter registration numbers alongside ballot access petition signatures in Pilcher v. Rains, brought by the Libertarian Party of Texas. In every election since except that of 2002, at least one of the party's candidates achieved 5% of the vote, guaranteeing ballot access. 

In May 2004 the party easily met the state's signature requirement. In the November 2006 elections, the party ran 168 candidates, and easily secured ballot access for 2008 in two-way races for state judicial positions, with the highest vote total going to Jerry Adkins for Supreme Court Place 4: 830,331 votes, or 24.5%. In the May 2019 local Texas elections, Tony Valdivia achieved 29.5% in the race for the San Antonio District 8 council seat. This result marked the first time that a Libertarian Party member exceeded 10% in a major Texas city council election. Unlike Republican and Democratic parties, the Libertarian Party of Texas holds county, district, and state conventions to nominate their candidates for public office. The party also accepts no tax dollars for its conventions.

Officeholders
 Ed Tidwell – Mayor of Lago Vista
 Larry Bush – Jarrell City Council

Campaigns and elections

2008 campaigns
The party fielded 173 candidates for federal, state, county, and local positions for the 2008 elections.

The party received media attention when it announced on August 1 that Suzanna Hupp, a former Texas state representative, had called Jason Jordan and Joe Allport, two Libertarian candidates for state representative in districts Republicans were concerned with losing, asking them to drop out of the race.

2010 campaigns
In January 2010, the party announced 193 Libertarians filed for nomination, including five gubernatorial candidates.

Texas House District 130 candidate Joe Spencer received media attention in February 2010 as a finalist for Best Information Web Site by About.com  part of the New York Times Company.

2012 election results
For the first time ever five Libertarians in Texas received over 1 million votes:
 Jaime O. Perez, Railroad Commissioner – 1,122,792
 RS Roberto Koelsch, Texas Supreme Court – 1,280,886
 Tom Oxford, Texas Supreme Court – 1,030,735
 Mark W. Bennett, Court of Criminal Appeals – 1,326,526
 William Bryan Strange, Court of Criminal Appeals – 1,313,746

Lillian Simmons achieved 30% in her race for Texas House. David Kinney in Hockley County had a competitive race for sheriff, receiving 2,479 votes for nearly 42% of the vote.

In Lago Vista, Libertarian candidate Ed Tidwell won his seat on City Council against a longtime incumbent.

2021 Libertarian National Committee chair special election
In 2021, LP of Texas chair Whitney Bilyeu was elected as the 21st National chair of the Libertarian National Committee (LNC) in a special election.

References

External links
 The Libertarian Party of Texas

Texas
Political parties established in 1971
Political parties in Texas